Dr. Nguyen Quoc Quan (born November 20, 1953) is a Vietnamese-born American mathematics researcher and human rights activist and a member of the leadership committee of the anti-communist organization Viet Tan. He was detained in April 17, 2012 after arriving at Tan Son Nhat airport in Ho Chi Minh City, Vietnam. On April 28, 2012, Vietnam's state media reported the "pro-democracy activist" has been arrested and accused of organizing "terrorism" activities. Previously, Dr Quan was arrested in Ho Chi Minh City in Vietnam on a trip on November 17, 2007 for preparing pro-democracy flyers. During that first trip, he brought in a Vietnamese translation of the book From Dictatorship to Democracy about nonviolent resistance.
He stood trial in Vietnam on May 13, 2008 on charges of "terrorism" and was sentenced to 6 months in prison. He was eventually released on May 17, 2008 and returned to his home in Elk Grove, California to his wife and two teenage sons. In 2012, he was re-arrested on another trip to Vietnam, and held in prison for 9 months. Following intense US pressure, he was deported on January 30, 2013.

Background 
Nguyen Quoc Quan is a former high school math teacher in Kien Giang, Vietnam. He escaped from Vietnam on a fishing boat in 1981, ending up in the United States where he earned a doctorate degree in mathematics from North Carolina State University. He has also practiced software engineering. He is a long-time democracy activist, a devotee of Martin Luther King Jr. and member of senior leadership committee of Viet Tan.

2007 arrest 

Nguyen Quoc Quan entered Vietnam on November 15, 2007 on a bicycle through the Cambodian border.

On November 17, 2007 along with two other Viet Tan members (Truong Van Ba, a Hawaiian restaurant owner, and Frenchwoman Nguyen Thi Thanh Van, a contributor to Viet Tan's Radio Chan Troi Moi radio show) he was arrested in the southern suburb of Ho Chi Minh City. At the time, they were leading a "democracy seminar" and preparing pro-democracy pamphlets, when 20 security officers raided the house. Also arrested in the same group were Vietnamese citizens Nguyen The Vu, Nguyen Trong Khiem, Nguyen Viet Trung and Thai journalist Somsak Khunmi.

The two-page pamphlet titled "Non-Violent Struggle: The Approach To Overcome Dictatorship" (translated from Vietnamese) and protesters to "faithfully maintain the discipline of non-violence."

The arrests were not officially confirmed by the Vietnamese government until November 22, 2007. During the press briefing, officials declined to state which laws the detained individuals have broken, nor released any information about Nguyen Quoc Quan, whose whereabouts remained unknown for almost a week.

At the beginning, state-controlled media in Vietnam acknowledged jailing only some, but not all activists. The website of the newspaper Sai Gon Giai Phong originally showed an image of US national Nguyen Quoc Quan wearing prison garb, but hours later replaced it with a manipulated image of him wearing a white shirt. Subsequent articles also listed his nationality as "unknown".

Authorities in Vietnam have attempted to link the arrest of these Viet Tan members to two Vietnamese Americans who reportedly attempted to smuggle firearms into the country six days after the original arrests. However, Viet Tan has firmly denied any association with those individuals.

International response 
The arrest was condemned by organizations and individuals worldwide including Reporters Without Borders and Human Rights Watch. In a letter to US Secretary of State Condoleezza Rice, US representatives Loretta Sanchez, Zoe Lofgren, and Neil Abercrombie wrote "Not only do we ask you to work to return these United States citizens to the United States, but we ask you to convey to the government of Vietnam that the arbitrary detention of United States citizens is unacceptable."

Coinciding with Human Rights Day on December 10, 2008, 11 members of the United States congress wrote a joint letter to the prime minister of Vietnam inquiring why the group of people are being detained in Vietnam and when they will be returned to their families in the United States.

Appeal for release 
In response to the detention, California-based Viet Tan organized an international campaign under the name of Free Them Now that included a petition demanding for an immediate release. The petition collected more than 18,000 signatures. In addition, an international lobbying campaign was undertaken to rally support of Western government officials behind this issue, including many elected officials from the United States, Norway, France and Australia. The broad support of this campaign by many officials is credited for his eventual release.

On January 7, 2008 55 members of the California assembly signed a letter to the president of the Vietnam stating the "arbitrary detention of these individuals is unacceptable" and requested their immediate release.

On March 12, 2008, chairman of Viet Tan, Do Hoang Diem, appeared before the US Senate Foreign Relations Committee’s subcommittee on East Asian and Pacific Affairs along with Nguyen Quoc Quan's wife to appeal to lawmakers to confront the issue. The next day, U.S. Representative Zoe Lofgren (D-CA) sponsored and introduced a house resolution condemning the detention of Dr. Nguyen Quoc Quan, and calls for a removal of permanent normal trade relations status with Vietnam until Dr. Nguyen is released.  Co-sponsors of the bill include U.S. representatives Steven Chabot (R-OH), Thomas Davis (R-VA), Bob Filner (D-CA), Nicholas Lampson (D-TX), Daniel Lungren (R-CA), Michael McNulty (D-NY), Ileana Ros-Lehtinen (R-FL) and Frank Wolf (R-VA).

Angela P. Aggeler, secretary for press and cultural affairs at the U.S. Embassy in Hanoi, said "U.S. officials both here in Vietnam and in Washington have repeatedly called for the release of any individual for peacefully expressing his or her views and we have urged them to release Dr. Quan and that he be allowed to return to the United States as swiftly as possible,"

Detention 
During Nguyen Quoc Quan's detention in Vietnam along with Thai citizen Somsak Khumni and Vietnamese businessman Nguyen The Vu, the U.S. consulate was allowed to visit him only once per month. Family visits were prohibited altogether. His wife was first granted a visa to visit him in January 2008, though the Vietnamese consulate revoked the visa one week prior her scheduled trip. She was able to talk to him only after his release 6 months later.

Trial and sentence 

Nguyen Quoc Quan along with the other two remaining detainees, Nguyen The Vu, and Somsak Kunmi stood trial in Vietnam on May 13, 2008. Officials from the U.S. consulate attended the behind-the-doors trial.
Nguyen Quoc Quan was sentenced to six months in prison, but since he has already served that time, was released on May 17, 2008. Nguyen The Vu was released immediately, and Somsak Kunmi will server another three months before he will be released. Other than the sentences, the preceding judge would not release any further detail of the trial.

Following the sentencing, a U.S. Embassy spokeswoman in Hanoi said in a statement: "We welcome his release and return to the United States. We remain disappointed by the decision of the Government of Vietnam to charge Dr. Quan with 'terrorism.' We are not aware of any information that would support charges of 'terrorism'. We object to the detention and prosecution of any individual for peacefully expressing his or her own views."

Michael Orona, The US State Department deputy director overseeing human rights, said that Quan "should not have been arrested in the first place."

When Dr. Quan returned to United States on May 17, 2008, he was greeted by a group of cheering supporters, including Sacramento assemblyman Dave Jones.

2012 arrest 
On April 17, 2012, Dr. Quan was at the Tan Son Nhat airport, when he called his wife and told her that he will call again shortly when he arrives at the hotel. Shortly after the phone call, he was then arrested at the airport in Ho Chi Minh City. Government officials did not confirm his arrest until five days later. He was detained on charges of terrorism  and for planning to "instigate a demonstration" during the anniversary of the Fall of Saigon. The charges were later changed to subversion of the state.  He is being detained for at least four months. According to his wife, he was planning to visit his younger sister and "talk about democracy and the rule of law". The U.S. consulate in Vietnam has confirmed that he has been arrested, but no formal charges have been filed and has not been granted a lawyer. Since his arrest, the US consulate was able to visit him only once.

International response 
Upon his 2012 arrest, Viet Tan released a statement that the Vietnamese government's accusation of 'terrorism' against Quan is "completely fabricated and has no basis." The Wall Street Journal, in its April 30 editorial, notes that the Vietnamese government holds a radically different definition of "terrorism," citing the authorities recent arrests of American citizens for crimes that aren't crimes in any normal country. Six members of the U.S. Congress signed a letter to Secretary of State Hillary Clinton and urged the State Department to call for Dr. Quan's immediate release on grounds that the Vietnamese government is "abusing its vague national security provisions as the pretext to arrest and detain individuals who peacefully advocate for religious and political freedom." Luke Simpkins, a Member of the Australian Parliament, has stated that the accusations by the Vietnamese government against Dr Quan are "completely fabricated and have no basis".

Appeal for release 
On April 14, 2012, his wife Mai Huong Ngo went before a House of Representative panel to appeal for help in releasing her husband. She specifically requested the help of Secretary of State Hillary Clinton.
Australian Member of Parliament Luke Simpkins also called for unconditional and immediate release of Dr Quan and all other voices of conscience. On May 17, US House Representatives Frank Wolf, Dan Lungren, Zoe Lofgren, Loretta Sanchez and Bob Filner co-signed a letter addressed urging U.S. Ambassador David Shear to "work to secure (Nguyen’s) immediate release so he can be reunited with his wife and two sons."

On January 11, 2013 as the trial date was announced, US representatives Zoe Lofgren, Loretta Sanchez, Hang Johnson and Gerry Connolly repeated writing a letter to David Shear, US ambassador to Vietnam, asking him to take "immediate actions to secure the release of Dr. Nguyen Quoc Quan."

2013 release 
His trial was set for January 22, 2013.  However, prior to the trial was to take place, it was postponed with no explanation. If charged, he could face up a ten years in prison. Following intense US diplomatic pressure, he was released, deported on January 30, 2013. He was reunited with his family after arriving in Los Angeles Airport on January 30, 2013.

See also 
 Human rights in Vietnam
 Viet Tan
 Lê Quốc Quân
 Do Hoang Diem
 Duy Hoang
 Hong Vo

References

External links 
 Viet Tan Official website, English Portal
 Free Them Now campaign
 US House Resolution condemning the detention of Dr. Nguyen Quoc Quan
 Free My Husband, Online Petition to the US Congress asking for their help in releasing him
 Democracy Activist, Portrait Nguyen Quoc Quan by Gianluca Costantini

Vietnamese democracy activists
Living people
Victims of human rights abuses
Vietnamese dissidents
Political repression in Vietnam
Politics of Vietnam
Prisoners and detainees of Vietnam
Việt Tân politicians
American people imprisoned abroad
1954 births
People from Elk Grove, California